Sambalpur State, also known as Hirakhand Kingdom was a sovereign state founded in the 1570 CE. It ruled over a vast kingdom spread across Western Odisha and Eastern Chhattisgarh in central-eastern India prior to the Maratha occupation in 1800 AD. From 1849 AD it was integrated with British Raj as a British District. Its capital was present-day Sambalpur city in Western Odisha.

History
Sambalpur State was founded in mid 16th century by Balarama Deva, a Rajput from Chauhan dynasty and younger brother of kingdom of Patna ruler Raja Narsingh Deva. In 1570 CE, the kingdom of Patna, ruled by the Chauhan dynasty was bifurcated. The southern portion of the Ang River was ruled by Narasingh Deva and his brother Balaram Deva received the northern side of the river of Sambalpur region. Balaram Deb established his new capital at Sambalpur. Sambalpur was ruled by the Chauhan dynasty till 1800. The kingdom of Sambalpur was also known as Hirakhand and Sambalpur was its capital.

The Garhjat states were eighteen vassal states under Sambalpur State. The Sambalpur kings favoured Sarangarh State owing to the readiness of its rulers to help their kingdom during military campaigns. Sambalpur was ruled by the Chauhan dynasty till 1800 when Sambalpur came under the Bhonsle dynasty of Nagpur State.

Sambalpur was invaded and occupied by the Marathas between 1808 and 1817. After the Third Anglo-Maratha War in 1817 the British Government returned Sambalpur to the Chauhan king, Jayant Singh, but his authority over its eighteen vassal states was withdrawn. The state was placed under British administration from 1818 to 1820, when local rule was restored and the principality became a British protectorate.                
When the ruler or the state died without a direct male heir in 1849, the British seized the state under the doctrine of lapse.

In 1857 during the Sepoy Mutiny there was a rebellion led by Surendra Sai of the Sambalpur ruling family, later renowned as 'Veer' (hero) Surendra Sai. The mutineers broke open the prison at Hazaribagh, where Surendra Sai was imprisoned and released all the prisoners. Surendra Sai fought against the British after reaching Sambalpur, eventually surrendering when the British suppressed the rebellion. In 1858 when Sambalpur was put under British administration it initially became part of the Cuttack division of the Bengal Presidency, but was transferred to the Central Provinces in 1862.

Rulers
The rulers of Sambalpur state of the Chauhan Dynasty:

Balarama Deva (1570 - 1595 CE)
Hrdayanarayana Deva (1595 - 1605)
Balabhadra Deva (1605 - 1630)
Madhukar Deva (1630-1660)
Baliara Deva (1650-1688)
Ratan Singh (1688 - 1690)
Chhatra Sai (1690 - 1725)
Ajit Singh (1725 - 1766)
Abhaya Singh (1766-1778)
Balabhadra Singh (1778 - 1781)
Jayanta Singh (1781 - 1818)
Maharaj Sai (1820 - 1827)
Rani Mohan Kumari (f) (1827 - 1833)
Narayan Singh (1833 - 1849)
Surendra Sai (in rebellion) (1809 - 1884)

See also
Maratha Empire
Doctrine of lapse
History of Sambalpur
Timeline of Sambalpur

References

External links
The Mirror Reflection of Sambalpur State through the Courtly Chronicle called Kosalananda Kavyam

Princely states of India
History of Odisha
Sambalpur district
Rajputs